Camilla Carlson (28 January 1930 – 28 February 1990) was a Norwegian poet, novelist and literary critic. Her literary debut was the poetry collection Sanden og havet from 1958. She was leader of the Norwegian Authors' Union from 1977 to 1981.

She was married to sculptor Ståle Kyllingstad.

References

1930 births
1990 deaths
People from Arendal
20th-century Norwegian poets
Norwegian literary critics
Women literary critics
Norwegian women critics
Norwegian women non-fiction writers
Norwegian women novelists
Norwegian women poets
20th-century Norwegian women writers
20th-century Norwegian novelists